The term vertical resistance, used commonly in context of plant selection, was first used by J.E. Vanderplank to describe single-gene resistance. This contrasted the term horizontal resistance which was used to describe many-gene resistance. Raoul A. Robinson further refined the definition of vertical resistance, emphasizing that in vertical resistance there are single genes for resistance in the host plant, and there are also single genes for parasitic ability in the parasite. This phenomenon is known as the gene-for-gene relationship, and it is the defining character of vertical resistance.

References

Phytopathology
Molecular biology